Cerambyx is a genus of beetles in the family Cerambycidae (longhorn beetles). They are commonly known as capricorn beetles, as their strong, stout and curved antennae, each segment of which flares towards the tip, are reminiscent of the horns of an Alpine Ibex (Capra ibex) or "capricorn".

Species
European species within this genus include:
Cerambyx cerdo Linnaeus, 1758
Cerambyx dux (Faldermann, 1837)
Cerambyx miles Bonelli, 1812
Cerambyx nodulosus Germar, 1817
Cerambyx scopolii Füssli, 1775 
Cerambyx welensii (Küster, 1846)

References

External links
 
 

Cerambycini
Cerambycidae genera
Taxonomy articles created by Polbot